Blues: Same Old Song is an album by singer and songwriter Leon Russell.  The album was first released as a CD on December 7, 1999. Album was by produced by Leon Russell and released by For Life Japan.  Songs were written by Leon.

Track listing
All tracks composed by Leon Russell.
      "Ways of a Woman" – 4:37 	
 	"House of Blues" – 2:41 	
 	"Rip Van Winkle" – 2:45 	
	"This Love I Have for You" – 3:13 		
 	"Lost Inside the Blues" – 4:26 	
 	"Dark Carousel" – 4:23 	
      "It's Impossible" – 2:40 	
 	"My Hard Times" – 4:28 	
 	"Strange Power of Love" – 3:26 	
 	"Make Everything Alright" – 3:34 	
 	"The Same Old Song" – 3:54 	
 	"End of the Road" – 2:27

Personnel
Leon Russell -	Primary Artist
Teddy Jack - Drums
Buster Phillips - Drums

References

External links

Leon Russell discography
Leon Russell lyrics 
Leon Russell Records
Leon Russell NAMM Oral History Program Interview (2012)

1999 albums
Leon Russell albums
Albums produced by Leon Russell